Hodel may refer to:

Donald P. Hodel (born 1935), United States Secretary of Energy and Secretary of Interior
George Hodel (1907–1999), American physician, and a suspect in the Elizabeth Short murder.
Max Hödel (1857–1878), failed assassin of Wilhelm I of Germany
Merwin Hodel (1931–1988), American football player
Nathan Hodel (born 1977), American football player
Ronny Hodel (born 1982), Swiss footballer
Hodel v. Irving, U.S. Supreme Court case
Hodel is the second oldest daughter in the play Fiddler on the Roof.

See also
Hodell

German-language surnames